Pure Storage is an American publicly traded technology company headquartered in Mountain View, California, United States. It develops all-flash data storage hardware and software products. Pure Storage was founded in 2009 and developed its products in stealth mode until 2011. Afterwards, the company grew in revenues by about 50% per quarter and raised more than $470 million in venture capital funding, before going public in 2015. Initially, Pure Storage developed the software for storage controllers and used generic flash storage hardware. Pure Storage finished developing its own proprietary flash storage hardware in 2015.

Corporate history
Pure Storage was founded in 2009 under the code name Os76 Inc. by John Colgrove and John Hayes. Initially, the company was setup within the offices of Sutter Hill Ventures, a venture capital firm, and funded with $5 million in early investments. Pure Storage raised another $20 million in venture capital in a series B funding round.

The company came out of stealth mode as Pure Storage in August 2011. Simultaneously, Pure Storage announced it had raised $30 million in a third round of venture capital funding. Another $40 million was raised in August 2012, in order to fund Pure Storage's expansion into European markets. In May 2013, the venture capital arm of the American Central Intelligence Agency (CIA), In-Q-Tel, made an investment in Pure Storage for an un-disclosed amount. That August, Pure Storage raised another $150 million in funding. By this time, the company had raised a total of $245 million in venture capital investments. The following year, in 2014, Pure Storage raised $225 million in a series F funding round, valuating the company at $3 billion.

Annual revenues for Pure Storage grew by almost 50% per quarter, from 2012 to 2014. It had $6 million in revenues in fiscal 2013, $43 million in fiscal 2014, and $174 million in fiscal 2015. Pure Storage sold 100 devices its first year of commercial production in 2012 and 1,000 devices in 2014. By late 2014, Pure Storage had 750 employees. Although it was growing, the company was not profitable. It lost $180 million in 2014.

In 2013, EMC sued Pure Storage and 44 of its employees who were former EMC employees, alleging theft of EMC's intellectual property. EMC also claimed that Pure Storage infringed some of their patents. Pure Storage counter-sued, alleging that EMC illegally obtained a Pure Storage appliance for reverse engineering purposes. In 2016, a jury initially awarded $14 million to EMC. A judge reversed the award and ordered a new trial to determine whether the EMC patent at issue was valid. Pure Storage and EMC subsequently settled the case for $30 million.

Pure Storage filed a notification of its intent to go public with the Securities Exchange Commission in August 2015. That October, 25 million shares were sold for a total of $425 million. The company hosted its first annual user conference in 2016. The following year, the Board of Directors appointed Charles Giancarlo as CEO, replacing Scott Dietzen. In 2017 (2018 fiscal year), Pure Storage was profitable for the first time and surpassed $1 billion in annual revenue.

Acquisitions 
In August 2018, Pure Storage made its first acquisition with the purchase of a data deduplication software company called StorReduce, for $25 million. In April the following year, they announced a definitive agreement for an undisclosed amount to acquire Compuverde, a software-based file storage company.

In September 2020, Pure Storage acquired Portworx, a provider of cloud-native storage and data-management platform based on Kubernetes, for $370 million.

Products
Pure Storage develops flash-based storage for data centers using consumer-grade solid state drives. Flash storage is faster than traditional disk storage, but more expensive. Pure Storage develops proprietary de-duplication and compression software to improve the amount of data that can be stored on each drive. It also develops its own flash storage hardware. Pure Storage has three primary product lines: FlashBlade for unstructured data, FlashArray//C which uses QLC flash, and the higher-end NVMe FlashArray//X. Its products use an operating system called Purity. Most of Pure's revenues come from IT resellers that market its  products to data center operators.

Product history
The first commercial Pure Storage product was the FlashArray 300 series. It was one of the first all-flash storage arrays for large data centers. It used generic consumer-grade, multi-level cell (MLC) solid-state drives from Samsung, but Pure Storage's proprietary controllers and software. The second generation product was announced in 2012. It added encryption, redundancies, and the ability to replace components like flash drives or RAM modules. In 2014, Pure Storage added two third-generation products to the 400 series. It also announced FlashStack, a converged infrastructure partnership with Cisco, in order to integrate Pure Storage's flash storage devices with Cisco's blade servers.

In 2015, Pure Storage introduced a flash memory appliance built on Pure Storage's own proprietary hardware. The new hardware also used 3D-NAND and had other improvements. In 2017, Pure Storage added artificial intelligence software that configures the storage-array. An expansion add-on appliance was introduced in 2017.

The intended uses of Pure Storage expanded as the product developed over time. It was initially intended primarily for server virtualization, desktop virtualization, and database programs. By 2017, 30 percent of Pure Storage's revenue came from software as a service providers and other cloud customers. FlashBlade, introduced in 2016, was intended for rapid restore, unstructured data, and analytics. In 2018, Pure Storage and Nvidia jointly developed and marketed AIRI, an appliance specifically for running artificial intelligence workloads.

In December 2021, Pure Storage introduced FlashArray//XL, a high-capacity 5U version of FlashArray.

In June 2022, Pure Storage announced a revamp of the FlashBlade platform with the release of FlashBlade//S.  This platform uses a revised chassis with compute blades and up to four DFM (DirectFlash Modules).  The new design enables reuse of DFMs between FlashBlade//S and FlashArray, addressing some of the issues of product sustainability and enabling Pure Storage to offer reconfiguration capabilities across platforms.

On 1st March 2023, Pure Storage announced FlashBlade//E.  The new platform is based on the FlashBlade//S, but allows the expansion of storage capacity through additional "EX chassis" that contain storage but no compute capability.  The intention of FlashBlade//E is to target more of the available market of hybrid and HDD-based systems, especially those with multi-petabyte capacity.

References

External links
 Official website

Companies listed on the New York Stock Exchange
Computer companies established in 2009
2015 initial public offerings
Computer storage companies
Cloud storage
Storage software
Computer data storage
Data storage
Information technology companies of the United States
Technology companies based in the San Francisco Bay Area
Companies based in Mountain View, California
Companies based in Silicon Valley